Dactylorhiza lapponica, the Lapland marsh-orchid, is an orchid found in Scandinavia, Germany, Austria, Switzerland, France, Italy and the Czech Republic.

Three subspecies are recognized:

Dactylorhiza lapponica subsp. angustata (Arv.-Touv.) Kreutz - France
Dactylorhiza lapponica subsp. lapponica - Finland, Norway, Sweden, Germany, Austria, Czech Republic
Dactylorhiza lapponica subsp. rhaetica H.Baumann & R.Lorenz - northern Italy

It was originally published and described by Lars Levi Laestadius and Carl Johan Hartman as Orchis angustifolia var. lapponica in Handb. Skand. Fl., edition 4 on page 281 in 1843, but it was then re-published as Dactylorhiza lapponica in Nom. Nov. Gen. Dactylorhiza Vol.5 in 1962.

The plant has been studied for In vitro seed germination.

References

Orchids of Europe
Flora of Finland
Flora of Norway
Flora of Sweden
Flora of the Alps
lapponica
Plants described in 1843